Church Avenue station may refer to:
Church Avenue station (BMT Brighton Line), a subway station near East 18th Street in Brooklyn
Church Avenue station (IND Culver Line), a subway station at McDonald Avenue in Brooklyn
Church Avenue station (IRT Nostrand Avenue Line), a subway station at Nostrand Avenues in Brooklyn